A live-action animated film is a film that combines live action filmmaking with animation.
Films that are both live-action and computer-animated tend to have fictional characters or figures represented and characterized by cast members through motion capture and then animated and modeled by animators. Films that are live action and traditionally animated use hand-drawn, computer-generated imagery (CGI) or stop motion  animation.

History

Origins of combining live-action and animation 
During the silent film era in 1920s and 1930s, the popular animated cartoons of Max Fleischer included a series in which his cartoon character, Koko the Clown, interacted with the live world; for example, having a boxing match with a live kitten. In a variation from this and inspired by Fleischer, Walt Disney's first directorial efforts, years before Oswald the Lucky Rabbit was born in 1927 and Mickey Mouse in 1928, were the live-action animated Alice Comedies cartoons, in which a young live-action girl named Alice interacted with animated cartoon characters.

Many previous films have combined live action with stop-motion animation using back projection, such as Willis O'Brien and Ray Harryhausen films in the United States, and Aleksandr Ptushko, Karel Zeman and, more recently, Jan Švankmajer in Eastern Europe. The first feature film combining these forms was The Lost World (1925). In the Soviet film The New Gulliver (1935), the only character who was not animated was Gulliver himself.

The 1940 Warner Bros. cartoon You Ought to Be in Pictures, directed by Friz Freleng, featured Warner Bros. characters interacting with live-action people. The animated sequence in the 1945 film Anchors Aweigh, in which Gene Kelly dances with an animated Jerry Mouse, is one of the actor/dancer's most famous scenes.

Development of live-action/animated films by Disney 
Throughout the decades, Disney experimented with mixed segments of live action and animation in several notable films, which are primarily considered live action. In the Latin American film pair Saludos Amigos (1943) and The Three Caballeros (1945),  Donald Duck cavorts with several Latin-American dancers, plus Aurora Miranda (sister of Carmen Miranda), who gives him a kiss. In Song of the South (1946) Uncle Remus sings "Zip-a-Dee-Doo-Dah" in an animated field, and tells the stories of Brer Rabbit through animated sequences. So Dear to My Heart (1949) improved upon this.

The 1964 film Mary Poppins gained significant notoriety for its blend of live action and animation, with an extensive sequence located "inside" a street painting, including Dick Van Dyke dancing with penguin waiters. In 1971 Bedknobs and Broomsticks transported Angela Lansbury and David Tomlinson to an underwater nightclub for dancing, followed by Tomlinson competing with anthropomorphic animals in an aggressive soccer match.

Inspired by the Swedish film Dunderklumpen! (1974), Walt Disney produced Pete's Dragon in 1977 to experiment with similar techniques, placing the animated dragon, Elliot, in a live-action setting.

The genre broke new ground with Who Framed Roger Rabbit in 1988, with Disney and Amblin Entertainment producing advanced special effects and photorealistic interactions among animated characters and live actors. Memorable moments include the piano duel between Donald Duck and his Looney Tunes rival Daffy Duck, the entrance of Jessica Rabbit, pairing Bugs Bunny and Mickey Mouse in the same scene, and Bob Hoskins handcuffed to the title character.

Techniques 
With live action and traditional animated films, two negatives were double-printed onto the same release print pre-digitally. Since then, more  complex techniques have used optical printers or aerial image animation cameras, which enabled more accurate positioning, and more realism for the interaction of actors and fictional animated characters. Often, every frame of the live action film was traced by rotoscoping, so that the animator could add his drawing in the exact position. With the rise of computer animation, combining live action and animation became common.

Criticism of techniques 

The Star Wars prequels and The Lord of the Rings trilogy, for example, include substantial amounts of animation. This is often not recognized as such by critics due to the realism of the animation. Roger Ebert said that "in my mind, it isn't animation, unless it looks like animation."

See also 
List of films with live action and animation
List of highest-grossing live-action/animated films

References 

Film genres
Animation